Empire Bay was a  collier. She was built by W Gray & Co Ltd, Hartlepool in 1940. She was owned by the Ministry of War Transport (MoWT) and managed by the Joseph Constantine Steamship Line Ltd. Empire Bay was sunk by German bombing off Middlesbrough on 15 January 1942.

Career
Empire Bay was built by William Gray & Sons Ltd, Hartlepool, Co. Durham. She was launched on 20 August 1940 and completed in November that year. She was built for the MoWT and placed under the management of Joseph Constantine Steamship Line Ltd. Her port of registry was West Hartlepool.

War service
Empire Bay was a member of a number of convoys during the Second World War.

HG59
Convoy HG 59 sailed from Gibraltar on 13 April 1941 and arrived at Liverpool on 1 May. Empire Bay was carrying a cargo of iron ore and was bound for Workington.

HG75
Convoy HG 75 which sailed from Gibraltar on 22 October 1941 and arrived at Liverpool on 3 November. Empire Bay was carrying a cargo of iron ore and was bound for Barrow-in-Furness.

OS 14
Convoy OS 14 which sailed from Liverpool on 13 December 1941 and arrived at Freetown, Sierra Leone on 3 January 1942. Empire Bay left the convoy shortly after it sailed and was bound for Glasgow. At the time she was armed with a 4" gun and four machine guns.

Sinking

On 15 January 1942, Empire Bay was bombed by Dornier Do 217 E-4 U5+HS of 8 Staffeln, Kampfgeschwader 2, based at Schiphol, the Netherlands. Empire Bay anti-aircraft guns damaged the Dornier, which later flew into the cable of a barrage balloon in Billingham and subsequently crashed at railway sidings in South Bank, Middlesbrough killing all four crew. At the time Empire Bay was in Tees Bay, off Middlesbrough while on a voyage from Hartlepool to London. The entire crew were rescued alive.

Official numbers and code letters

Official numbers were a forerunner to IMO Numbers. Empire Bay had the UK Official Number 160786 and used the Code Letters GNFX.

Propulsion
Empire Bay was powered by a triple-expansion steam engine manufactured by the Central Marine Engine Works, West Hartlepool. The engine developed .

References

1940 ships
Ships built on the River Tees
Empire ships
Ministry of War Transport ships
Steamships of the United Kingdom
Ships sunk by German aircraft
World War II shipwrecks in the North Sea
Maritime incidents in January 1942